This is a list of Filipino Americans who have made significant contributions to the American culture, politics, or society. It also includes those with notable mentions in the American media.

To be included in this list, the person must have a Wikipedia article showing they are Filipino American or must have references showing they are Filipino American and are notable.

List

Arts and letters

Dance 

Stella Abrera – ballet dancer
Cheryl Burke – ballroom dancer, participant in Dancing with the Stars
Ryan "Ryanimay" Conferido – member of Quest Crew and alumnus of So You Think You Can Dance
Jeffrey Cirio - ballet dancer
Napoleon D'umo – hip-hop choreographer on So You Think You Can Dance since season four and supervising choreographer for America's Best Dance Crew
Angelica Generosa – ballet dancer
Cris Judd – choreographer
Charles Klapow – choreographer for all three High School Musical films, The Ice Tour, and The Cheetah Girls 2
Brian Puspos – choreographer
Dominic "D-Trix" Sandoval – member of Quest Crew and alumnus of So You Think You Can Dance
Ken San Jose – street dancer and singer

Education 

Jeremy Castro Baguyos, M.Mus.– Professor of Music at the University of Nebraska Omaha and Principal Bass of the Des Moines Metro Opera Summer Music Festival Orchestra.
Jose B. Cruz, Jr., Ph.D. – Distinguished Professor of Engineering, Ohio State University
Conrado Gempesaw, Ph.D. – 17th President, St. John's University, New York City
Ruth Elynia S. Mabanglo, Ph.D. – Professor of Philippine Literature, University of Hawaii at Manoa; Presidential Citation for Meritorious Teaching, 1996
Kevin Nadal, Ph.D. – Professor of Psychology, John Jay College of Criminal Justice; author, Filipino American Psychology: A Handbook of Theory, Research, and Clinical Practice; former president of Asian American Psychological Association
Baldomero Olivera, Ph.D. – Distinguished Professor of Biology, University of Utah in Salt Lake City, Utah; first Fil-Am member of the United States National Academy of Sciences; 2007 Harvard University Scientist of the Year.
Rhacel Parrenas, Ph.D. – Professor of American Studies and Sociology at Brown University. World-renowned academic, has delivered lectures at over 100 colleges and universities in Asia, Europe, and the Americas.
Talitha Espiritu, Ph.D. – Associate Professor of English at Wheaton College
E. San Juan, Jr., Ph.D. – Fellow, W.E.B. Du Bois Institute, Harvard University
Craig Abaya. – Director of Digital Media & Entertainment Programs, San Francisco State University, 2000–2014
Trinity Ordona, Ph.D. – Professor of American Studies, City College of San Francisco, 2001–present
Vivian M. Vasquez, Ph.D. – Multi-award-winning Professor of Education at American University in Washington, DC, and the author of a dozen books on the subject of education and literacy.
Leon O. Chua, Ph.D.– Contributor to both the nonlinear circuit theory and cellular neural network theory, and professor of electrical engineering and computer science at University of California at Berkeley and Purdue University.
Raymundo Favila, Ph.D.– Mathematician contributing to stratifiable congruences and geometric inequalities.
Robyn Rodriguez, Ph.D.–Professor and Chair of the Department of Asian American Studies at the University of California, Davis. Founded the Bulosan Center for Filipino Studies, which is purportedly the first Filipino Studies center in the United States.
Catherine Ceniza Choy, Ph.D.– Professor of Ethnic Studies at University of California, Berkeley.
Vicente L. Rafael, Ph.D.– Professor of Southeast Asian history at Cornell University.

Graphic arts 

Alfredo Alcala – Filipino comic book artist.
Lynda Barry – Filipino mestizo comic strip cartoonist and novelist; created prototype for TV hit series The Simpsons
Don Figueroa – comic book artist for IDW Publishing and Dreamwave Entertainment, working on various Transformers titles.
Rafael Kayanan – comic book artist and master level instructor in Sayoc Kali.
Nick Manabat – creator of Cybernary, comic book artist for Wildstorm Productions
Van Partible – creator of Johnny Bravo
Whilce Portacio – created Bishop of the X-Men, co-founder of Image Comics.
Romeo Tanghal – comic book artist.
Leo Zulueta – Tattoo artist
Tony DeZuniga – co-creator of Jonah Hex

Visual art 
Terry Acebo Davis
Michael Janis – Award-winning glass artist/
Manuel Ocampo – Painter
Alfonso Ossorio
Mail Order Brides/M.O.B.
Nelfa Querubin – Ceramic artist
Lordy Rodriguez
Stephanie Syjuco
Joseph Santos (1/4th Filipino) – Award-winning painter
Leo Valledor(1936–1989) – painter who pioneered the Hard-edge painting style
Carlos Villa (1936–2013) – visual artist, curator and professor
Jenifer K. Wofford, M.F.A. – Assistant professor at the University of San Francisco

History 

Belinda Aquino –  author, professor, women's and civil rights activist, and founder of the Center for Philippine Studies at the University of Hawaiʻi at Mānoa.
Dorothy Cordova – activist, professor, co-founder of the Filipino American National Historical Society.
Fred Cordova – author, Filipinos: Forgotten Asian Americans; co-founder, Filipino American National Historical Society.
Dawn Mabalon - activist, author Little Manila is in the Heart: The Making of Filipina/o Community in Stockton, California,; Duke University Press, Journey for Justice, The Life of Larry Itliong; Bridge & Delta Publishing

Journalism 

Byron Acohido – 1997 Pulitzer Prize awardee; prose novelist.
Leah Borromeo – journalist and documentary filmmaker
Natasha Brown – anchor, KYW in Philadelphia
Cher Calvin – anchor, KTLA Channel 5 Los Angeles
Katherine Creag – reporter, WNBC in New York City
Ernabel Demillo – TV host
Veronica De La Cruz – MSNBC news anchor
Rovilson Fernandez – TV host, model, editor
Emil Guillermo – award-winning journalist, writer, and broadcaster. First Filipino American to anchor a regularly scheduled national news program, NPR All Things Considered, May 1989. Winner of American Book Award, 2000.
Cassidy Hubbarth – ESPN Anchor
Noel Izon – documentary filmmaker
Kristine Johnson – anchor, WCBS-TV New York
Lloyd LaCuesta – television journalist, KTVU South Bay bureau chief
David Lat – legal commentator and author, founder of Above the Law (website)
Pat Loika – Comic podcaster
Elita Loresca – former NBC4 and current KTRK-TV Los Angeles weathercaster and meteorologist
Michelle Malkin – commentator on FOX News, author
Jean Martirez – anchor for KTTV Fox 11 in Los Angeles
Cheryl Diaz Meyer – 2004 Pulitzer Prize Winner
Libertito Pelayo – publisher and editor-in-chief, Filipino Reporter newspaper
Maria Quiban – meteorologist & news anchor, KTTV/KCOP-TV in Los Angeles
Elaine Quijano – correspondent at CBS News, formerly with CNN
Victoria Recaño – correspondent on such programs as The Insider and Inside Edition
Maria Ressa – Nobel Peace laureate, journalist, author and co-founder of Rappler. 
coFrances Rivera – journalist and television news anchor for Boston's NBC affiliate WHDH, New York's CW affiliate WPIX and NBC News
Anne Quito – architecture and design critic for Quartz
Alex Tizon – 1997 Pulitzer Prize in Investigative Reporting, Seattle Times; author of Big Little Man: In Search of My Asian Self, Houghton Mifflin Harcourt, 2014.
Corky Trinidad – Honolulu Star Bulletin editorial cartoonist, 1939–2009
Jia Tolentino – essayist and staff writer for The New Yorker
Pablo S. Torre – sportswriter & columnist for ESPN.com and ESPN The Magazine
Jose Antonio Vargas – 2008 Pulitzer Prize Winner in Journalism for his work with the Washington Post; DREAM Act advocate; undocumented immigrant
Mona Lisa Yuchengco – founder, Filipinas magazine

Law 

Simeon R. Acoba, Jr. – former Associate Justice, Hawaii State Supreme Court
Kiwi Camara – attorney; youngest person to enter Harvard Law School
Tani Cantil-Sakauye – Chief Justice of California
Noel Francisco – 47th Solicitor General of the United States
Mario Ramil – former Associate Justice, Hawaii State Supreme Court
Sean Reyes – Utah Attorney General

Literature 

Maria Amapola Cabase - aka Amapola Cabase - Woodward published Coming Home, her first novel. Coming Home won the Florida Writers Association's Royal Palm Literary Award for 'Romantic Fiction' and was a finalist for 'Best Fiction' of 2004 in Foreword Magazine. In 2005, she published Promising Skies, which received critical acclaim from New York Times best-selling author Ellen Tanner Marsh.
Peter Bacho – author of the American Book Award winning novel Cebu
Cecilia Manguerra Brainard – author of When the Rainbow Goddess Wept, Magdalena
Carlos Bulosan – author, America Is in the Heart.
Regie Cabico – Slam poet and performer
Elaine Castillo – author, America Is Not the Heart.
Gilbert Luis R. Centina III – novelist and award-winning poet
Melissa de la Cruz – author of teen lit series The Au Pairs, The Ashleys, and Blue Bloods
Alex Gilvarry – author of From the Memoirs of a Non-Enemy Combatant and Eastman Was Here
Vince Gotera – poet and editor of the North American Review
Jessica Hagedorn – playwright and author, Dogeaters, The Gangster of Love, Dream Jungle
Tess Uriza Holthe – author of When the Elephants Dance
Ma. Luisa Aguilar Igloria – award-winning poet
Erin Entrada Kelly – author of Hello, Universe, which won the Newbery Medal.
R. Zamora Linmark – author of Rolling the R's
Aimee Nezhukumatathil – award-winning poet and professor
Barbara Jane Reyes – poet
Al Robles – activist and poet, author of Rappin' With Ten Thousand Carabaos in the Dark
Randy Romero – writer
Eileen Tabios – poet
Lysley Tenorio – author of Monstress
Alex Tizon – Pulitzer Prize-winning journalist and author of "Big Little Man: In Search of My Asian Self"
Jose Garcia Villa – poet, writer, generationalist; pre-Beat Generation influence
Jason Tanamor – author of the urban fantasy YA/NA novel "Vampires of Portlandia"

Theatre 

Joan Almedilla – Broadway actor, Miss Saigon, Les Misérables
Jon Jon Briones – Broadway, West End and television actor, Miss Saigon, The Assassination of Gianni Versace: American Crime Story, American Horror Story: Apocalypse
Laurie Cadevida – Broadway actress, Miss Saigon, Aida, The Pajama Game
Ali Ewoldt – Broadway actress. First woman of color to play lead role of Christine Daaé in The Phantom of the Opera (1986 musical) on Broadway. Half Filipino (maternal side).
Van Ferro – BroadwayWorld Chicago Award-winning actor
Rachelle Ann Go – Broadway and West End actress. Credits include Gigi in Miss Saigon, Fantine in Les Misérables, and Eliza Schuyler Hamilton in Hamilton.
Jose Llana – Broadway actor, Drama Desk Award winner.
Robert Lopez – composer, Tony Award Winner, writer of "Let It Go" from the movie Frozen.

Deedee Magno Hall – cast member, national touring and San Francisco cast of Wicked; former mouseketeer
Paolo Montalbán – Broadway and television actor
Eva Noblezada – Broadway and West End actress. Credits include Kim in the Broadway and West End revivals of Miss Saigon, Éponine in West End's Les Misérables, and originating Eurydice in Hadestown. Half Filipino (Paternal side), Half Mexican (Maternal side).
Ralph Peña – founding member and artistic director, Ma-Yi Theater Company
George Salazar – Broadway actor, Godspell, Be More Chill
Lea Salonga – Broadway and West End actress. She is a Tony, Olivier, Drama Desk, and OCC Award winner. Lea was the singing voice for Princess Jasmine and Mulan in the Walt Disney movies. She was also most recently nominated for a Grammy Award for being in the cast of the most recent Broadway revival of Once on This Island

Business 
Diosdado Banatao – Silicon Valley engineer and businessman
Caterina Fake – Half-Filipino co-founder of Flickr and Hunch.
Bobby Murphy – co-founder, Snapchat
Josie Natori – founder, The Natori Company
Loida Nicolas-Lewis – chairman and CEO, TLC Beatrice International Holdings, Inc.
Peter Valdes – co-founder, Tivoli Systems Inc. (an IBM Company)
Sheila Lirio Marcelo – entrepreneur and founder of Care.com
DJ Rose – Roslynn Alba Cobarrubias Founder of mydiveo, helped launch myspace.com
Jennifer Rubio – co-founder & President, Away (luggage)
Jeremiah Abraham – founder & CEO of Tremendous Communications, film producer, award-winning marketer and strategist, advocate for Asian & Asian American visibility in Hollywood

Culinary arts 

 Amy Besa and Romy Dorotan – activists and co-owners of Filipino restaurant Purple Yam in Brooklyn, New York, and co-authors of Memories of Philippine Kitchens, which in 2007, won the IACP Jane Grigson Award for Distinguished Scholarship in the Quality of Research Presentation.
Cristeta Comerford – first woman executive chef at the White House.
Tom Cunanan – James Beard Award-winning chef of Filipino restaurant Bad Saint in Washington, D.C.
Paul Qui – James Beard Award-winning chef and winner of Top Chef: Texas.
Dale Talde – Top Chef: Chicago and Top Chef: All Stars contestant and owner of the restaurant Talde in Brooklyn, New York.
Alvin Cailan – chef and host of First We Feast's The Burger Show.
Carlo Lamagna - chef and owner of Magna's Kusina. Food & Wine Best New Chef 2021,  & Jame's Beard nominee Portland, Oregon

Education 

Astrid S. Tuminez – first female president of Utah Valley University
 Flora Arca Mata – first Filipino-American Teacher in California

Fashion and pageantry

Fashion 
Monique Lhuillier – Hollywood fashion designer 
Kelsey Merritt – fashion model, first Filipino woman to ever walk in the Victoria's Secret Fashion Show
Josie Natori – Hollywood fashion designer
Geena Rocero – transgender fashion model and activist, founder of the Gender Proud organization
Leeann Tweeden – model, television personality

Pageants 

Sonya Balmores – Miss Hawaii Teen USA 2004
Angela Perez Baraquio – Miss America 2001
Ginger Conejero – Miss Philippines-Air 2006, television host/reporter
Alice Dixson – Binibining Pilipinas-International 1986, actress and model
Ki'ilani Arruda – Miss Teen USA 2020

Laura Dunlap – Miss Philippines Earth 2003
Jamie Herrell – Miss Earth 2014 and Miss Philippines Earth 2014
Kristina Janolo – Miss Florida 2011
Krista Kleiner – Binibining Pilipinas-International 2010, actress, martial artist, singer, dancer and composer
Christi McGarry – Binibining Pilipinas-Intercontinental 2015
Katarina Rodriguez – Miss World Philippines 2018, model, athlete
Vanessa Minnillo – Miss Teen USA 1998, actress and television host
Robyn Watkins – Miss Oklahoma USA 2006
Patricia Tumulak – Miss Philippines-Fire 2009
Megan Young – Miss World 2013, Miss World Philippines 2013, actress, model, television host and VJ
 Audra Mari - Miss North Dakota Teen USA 2011, Miss Teen USA 2011 First Runner-Up, Miss North Dakota USA 2014, Miss USA 2014 First Runner-Up, Miss World America 2016, Miss World 2016 Top 11 Finalist 
Maureen Montagne - The Miss Globe 2021, Miss Arizona USA 2015 and model
 Chelsea Hardin — Miss Hawaii USA 2016 and Miss USA 2016 First Runner-Up
 Kimberly "Kim" Layne – Miss Idaho USA 2020 and Miss USA 2020 First Runner-Up
Jenny Ramp – Miss Philippines Earth 2022
R'Bonney Gabriel - Fashion designer, model crowned Miss Texas USA 2022, Miss USA 2022, first Filipino-American Miss USA, and Miss Universe 2022
Katrina Dimaranan - Miss Supranational 2018 1st Runner Up, Miss Universe Philippines Tourism 2021, model, actress, and television personality

Health science 

Fe del Mundo, MD – first Asian and female student at Harvard Medical School
Kevin Nadal, Ph.D. – Associate Professor of Psychology, John Jay College of Criminal Justice, New York City; author, Filipino American Psychology: A Handbook of Theory, Research, and Clinical Practice
Maria P. P. Root – psychologist
Mariano Yogore (1921–2006) – Professor and Head of Institute of Public Health.

Labor 

Larry Itliong – Co-founder of the Agricultural Workers Organizing Committee, assistant director of the United Farm Workers, co-leader of the Delano grape strike
Philip Vera Cruz – Co-founder, Agricultural Workers Organizing Committee, which later became the United Farm Workers; Vice-president, United Farm Workers

Military 

Babette Bolivar – Rear Admiral (Lower Half), U.S. Navy. Women Divers Hall of Fame inductee.
Raquel C. Bono – Rear Admiral (Lower Half), U.S. Navy. Former Command Surgeon, United States Pacific Command
Brian Bulatao - Captain, U.S. Army, 75th Ranger Regiment. Former CIA Chief Operations Officer. Former Under Secretary of State for Management.

Jose Calugas – Captain, U.S. Army. Medal of Honor recipient, World War II
Cary C. Chun – Brigadier General, U.S. Air Force, retired. Former Commander, 50th Space Wing, Schriever Air Force Base, Colorado. First U.S. Air Force General Officer of Filipino descent.
Anatolio B. Cruz – Rear Admiral (Lower Half), U.S. Navy. Former Deputy Commander, United States Fourth Fleet
John R. D’Araujo Jr. – Major General, U.S. Army, retired. First Filipino American to be promoted to Major General; Former Director of the Army National Guard Bureau. Former Director of the Recovery Division for the Federal Emergency Management Agency (FEMA)
Rudolph Davila – First Lieutenant, U.S. Army. Medal of Honor recipient, World War II
Florence Finch – Seaman second class, U.S. Coast Guard. Medal of Freedom recipient for actions during the occupation of the Philippine Islands in World War II
Oscar Hilman – Brigadier General, U.S. Army, Former Commanding General of 81st Stryker Brigade Combat Team.
Eleanor Mariano – Rear Admiral (Lower Half), U.S. Navy, retired. First Filipino American to be promoted to a flag officer rank; former White House physician
Victorino Mercado – Rear Admiral (Lower Half), U.S. Navy. Former Director of Maritime Operations of U.S. Pacific Fleet. Former Assistant Secretary of Defense for Strategy, Plans and Capabilities. First Filipino American Surface Warfare Officer to achieve flag rank
José B. Nísperos – Private, U.S. Army. Medal of Honor Recipient. First Asian Medal of Honor recipient.
Ronald Ravelo – Captain, U.S. Navy. Former Commanding Officer of USS Abraham Lincoln. First Filipino American commander of an aircraft carrier
Eldon Regua – Major General, U.S. Army Reserve. Former Commanding General, 75th Division (BCTD);
Edward Soriano – Lieutenant General,U.S. Army, retired. Former Commanding General of I Corps
Ramon S. Subejano – Private First Class, U.S. Army. Silver Star recipient, World War II
Benigno G. Tabora – Sergeant Major, U.S. Army. Purple Heart recipient, World War II
Antonio Taguba – Major General, U.S. Army, retired. Author of the Taguba Report
Telesforo Trinidad – Fireman Second Class, U.S. Navy. Medal of Honor Recipient. Only Asian American Naval Recipient of the Medal of Honor
Eleanor Valentin – Rear Admiral (Lower Half), Medical Corps, U.S. Navy. Commander, Naval Medical Support
Antonio A. Aguto Jr. - Lieutenant General, U.S. Army. Commanding General of First Army
Leonard Dollaga - Rear Admiral, U.S. Navy. Commander, Submarine Group 7 and Commander, Task Force 74 and Task Force 54

Politics 

Peter Aduja – State Legislature, Hawaii. First Filipino American elected in the United States.
Larry Asera – First Filipino American elected to a city council in the continental United States (1973)
Steve Austria – Republican congressman from Beavercreek, Ohio.
Rob Bonta – First Filipino American California State Legislator, first Filipino American Attorney General of California
Thelma Buchholdt – First female Filipino American state legislator (1974); first Asian American to be elected President of the National Order of Women Legislators (1987).
Christopher Cabaldon – Mayor of West Sacramento, California, born in 1965.
Romeo Munoz Cachola – Former member of the Hawaii House of Representatives
Benjamin J. Cayetano – First Filipino American governor in the U.S., for the state of Hawaii.
TJ Cox – Former U.S. House of Representatives of California, his mother is Filipino.
John Ensign – U.S. Senator from Nevada; his great-grandmother is from the Philippines
Jose Esteves – Former Mayor of Milpitas, California. In office 2002-2008 and 2010–2016; served as a member of the City Council from 1998 to 2002.
Tony Fulton – member of Nebraska State Legislature.
Sonny Ganaden – member of the Hawaii House of Representatives
Mike Guingona – Council Member and Former Mayor of Daly City, California.
Lorraine Rodero Inouye – Hawai'i state senator, former Mayor of Hawaii County and the first Filipino-American woman to serve as mayor of a U.S. County. 
Donna Mercado Kim – Hawai'i state senator, former President of the Hawaiʻi Senate.
 Rolando Lavarro, Jr. – Jersey City council president, elected to city council in 2011.
John W. Marshall, Virginia Secretary of Public Safety and Director of the U.S. Marshals Service, his mother is of Filipino descent.
Thurgood Marshall, Jr., White House senior staff member during the Clinton Administration, his mother is of Filipino descent.
Benjamin Menor – Filipino American State Legislator, Hawaii, 1962.
 Jeff Moneda – City Manager of Foster City, California.
Mona Pasquil – in November 2009, became the first woman to serve as acting lieutenant governor of California
David Pendleton – former Minority Floor Leader, Hawaii House of Representatives
Sean David Reyes – Utah Attorney General and first ethnic minority elected to state office in Utah; father is Filipino, father's first cousin was 7th President of the Philippines, Ramon Magsaysay.
Bobby Scott – U.S. House of Representatives of Virginia, maternal grandfather is Filipino.
Michele J. Sison – Assistant Secretary of State for International Organization Affairs
Kris Valderrama – Member of the Maryland House of Delegates, representing the 26th District
Ron Villanueva – Member of the Virginia House of Delegates, representing the 21st District. A former member of the Coast Guard Reserves, he is also an alumnus of Old Dominion University.
Brian Bulatao - Former CIA Chief Operations Officer. Former Under Secretary of State for Management.
Arvin Amatorio - current mayor of Bergenfield borough]].

Religion 

Ruben Habito, Filipino Zen Master of the Sanbō Kyōdan lineage and founder of Maria Kannon Zen Center in Dallas, Texas.
Oscar A. Solis – First Filipino American Roman Catholic bishop in the United States, 10th Bishop of Salt Lake City.
Bruce Reyes-Chow – The first Filipino American head of a major denomination in the U.S. (mother is American-born Filipino), was elected to a two-year term as Moderator of the 218th General Assembly of the Presbyterian Church (U.S.A.) on June 21, 2008.

Sports 
 
Doug Baldwin (Filipina grandmother) – Former NFL Player, Super Bowl Champion
Tedy Bruschi – Former NFL Player, three-time Super Bowl Champion 
Jordan Clarkson – NBA player 
Kihei Clark – College basketball player
Boogie Ellis – basketball player 
Roman Gabriel - former NFL quarterback (Los Angeles Rams & Philadelphia Eagles). NFL Most Valuable Player (1969); 4× ProBowl (1967–1969 & 1973); NFL passing yards leader (1973); 2× NFL passing touchdowns leader (1969 & 1973)
Jalen Green – basketball player 
Tim Lincecum - former MLB pitcher (San Francisco Giants & Los Angeles Angels). Won multiple World Series championships, won multiple Cy Young Awards, threw multiple no-hitters, and elected to multiple All-Star Games. 
Jason Robertson - NHL player for the Dallas Stars 
Nicholas Robertson - NHL player for the Toronto Maple Leafs 
Raymond Sarmiento - tennis player 
Erik Spoelstra – NBA Head Coach
Jimmy Alapag - former PBA player and current assistant coach for Stockton Kings.

Television and film 

Ruthie Alcaide – MTV The Real World: Hawaii cast
Benjamin Alves – actor
Kaye Abad – actress
Craig Abaya – film producer/director (p.g.a.), musician, educator, and photographer.
Neile Adams – actress
Gerald Anderson – actor, model
Nicole Gale Anderson – actress (Jonas and Beauty & the Beast)
Siena Agudong – actress (Star Falls, Alex & Me and No Good Nick)
Ruben Aquino – Disney animator (The Lion King and The Little Mermaid)
Ashley Argota – actress, singer, musician (True Jackson VP, Bucket & Skinner's Epic Adventures, The Fosters, How to Build a Better Boy)
Cecilio Asuncion – director, host, producer, filmmaker, and executive.
Jon Jon Augustavo – award-winning filmmaker and music video director known for Macklemore – "Thrift Shop", "Can't Hold Us", "Same Love"
Alley Baggett – model, actress
Brandon Baker – actor (Johnny Tsunami and Johnny Kapahala: Back on Board)
Kimee Balmilero – member of the American version of Hi-5, a children's musical group
Roxanne Barcelo – actress, model, singer
Dante Basco – actor, dancer, rapper, poet
Dion Basco – actor
Jacob Batalon – actor
Dave Bautista – former professional mixed martial artist, and former professional wrestler, Currently part of an ensemble cast in Marvel's Guardians of the Galaxy.
Eric Bauza (born 1979) - Canadian-born actor (The Fairly OddParents, El Tigre: The Adventures of Manny Rivera, Breadwinners, Unikitty!)
Paris Berelc – actress (Mighty Med, Invisible Sister, Lab Rats: Elite Force, Alexa & Katie)
Joy Bisco – actress
Leann Bowen - writer

Billy Crawford
Jameson Blake – actor, dancer and television personality
Eileen Boylan – actress (South of Nowhere, General Hospital).
Q. Allan Brocka – director, producer, actor, best known for directing the film Eating Out and its sequel.
Cher Calvin – actress, news anchor (KTLA Morning News), Miss New York first runner up
Donita Rose – actress
Jade Villalon – actress, singer and songwriter
Louie del Carmen – story artist, DreamWorks Animation; storyboard artist, Disney Channel's Kim Possible, Nickelodeon's Invader Zim, Rugrats and The Mighty B!.
Ronnie del Carmen – story supervisor, Finding Nemo; storyboard artist, Batman: The Animated Series
T.V. Carpio – actress
Tia Carrere – actress and singer (Relic Hunter, Wayne's World, Wayne's World 2)
Phoebe Cates – actress.
Christina Chang – actress, (24, CSI: Miami, Private Practice, Nashville)
Pia Clemente – first Filipino to be nominated for a competitive Academy Award for the live-action short, Our Time Is Up (2004)
Emy Coligado – actress, (Piama, Francis' wife, Malcolm in the Middle).
Max Collins – actress and model
Michael Copon – actor (Blue Ranger in Power Rangers Time Force, Bring It On: In It to Win It)
 Eugene Cordero - actor
Rik Cordero – director
Jessica Cox - first armless pilot in aviation history, Taekwondo Black Belt, and subject of the documentary Right Footed
Darren Criss – actor/singer (Blaine Anderson in Glee and Andrew Cunanan in The Assassination of Gianni Versace: American Crime Story), mother is an immigrant from the Philippines
Christina Cuenca – Miss Louisiana USA 2006; actress
Jake Cuenca – actor and soccer player
Mark Dacascos – actor and martial arts expert
Charles Michael Davis – actor and model
Marpessa Dawn – actress
Billy Dec – Emmy Award-winning actor/producer (Empire, Criminal Minds, Today Show)
Dean Devlin – screenwriter and producer of many films including Independence Day, Godzilla and Stargate, also occasional actor
Ivan Dorschner – actor, model and former Pinoy Big Brother: Teen Clash of 2010 5TH big placer
Tippy Dos Santos – singer, actress
Kyle Echarri – singer and songwriter The Voice Kids (Philippines season 2) finalist 
Andi Eigenmann – actress
Mar Elepano – filmmaker, production supervisor of the John C. Hench Lab, Division of Animation and Digital Arts, USC School of Cinematic Arts
Tommy Esguerra – actor, model and former Pinoy Big Brother 737 2015 2nd big placer
Matt Evans – actor
Ava Fabian – actress, model
Roshon Fegan – actor (Shake It Up (TV series))
Von Flores – actor
Joel de la Fuente – actor
Karen Gaviola – Television Producer and Director, Magnum P.I., Lucifer, Hawaii Five-0, Love Is
Charles Gemora – Hollywood makeup artist

Baron Geisler – actor, businessman, model, resource speaker, amateur artist and aspiring poet
Raymond Gutierrez – actor and model, gay twin brother of Richard Gutierrez
Richard Gutierrez – actor and model
Deedee Magno Hall - actress and singer 
Melissa Howard – actress-comedienne, MTV Real World New Orleans cast
Vanessa Hudgens – half-Filipino actress, singer, dancer and television star (High School Musical)
Stella Hudgens – half-Filipino actress
Dan Inosanto – actor, martial arts instructor who is best known as a training partner of Bruce Lee, an authority on Jeet Kune Do and Filipino Martial Arts including Eskrima and Pencak Silat
Diana Lee Inosanto – actress, stuntwoman, film director (The Sensei)
Cris Judd – actor, dancer, choreographer and former husband of Jennifer Lopez, lead dancer of Michael Jackson and work with different singers, appeared on Unfabulous, Eve, Half & Half and Everybody Loves Raymond
Tessa Keller, model and reality television personality
Abigail Kintanar – actress, host, reality show vixen. VH1's CelebReality Star "Red Oyster"
Jo Koy – stand-up comedian
Jennie Kwan – actress (California Dreams)
Tony Labrusca – actor, model and singer
Boom Labrusca – actor, model
Lalaine – television star (Lizzie McGuire).
Liza Lapira – actress (Crazy, Stupid, Love, 21, Fast & Furious, NCIS, Traffic Light, 9JKL)
Kris Lawrence – singer
Sharon Leal – half-Filipino, half-African American actress (Boston Public, Dreamgirls, Why Did I Get Married? and Supergirl_(TV_series)Reggie Lee – actor
Matthew Libatique – cinematographer (Requiem for a Dream, The Fountain, Inside Man and Iron Man)
Xian Lim – actor and model 
Tiffany Limos – actress
BarBara Luna – actress

Manila Luzon - drag queen, recording artist, comedian, and reality television personality (RuPaul's Drag Race and RuPaul's Drag Race All Stars)
Tara Macken – actress
Camille Mana – actress (One on One)
Edu Manzano – actor and politician
Luis Manzano – model and television host
Alec Mapa – actor and comedian (Half & Half)
Jessica Marasigan – actress, model, beauty queen and former Pinoy Big Brother 737 2015 housemate
Anna Maria Perez de Taglé – actress (Hannah Montana, Camp Rock, Camp Rock 2: The Final Jam, the 2009 remake of Fame), former Star Search contestant; granddaughter of Filipina singer, Sylvia La Torre.
Ayra Mariano – actress and model
Bruno Mars – singer and dancer
Marie Matiko – actress (The Art of War)
Caitlin McHugh – actress and model (The Vampire Diaries)
Chad McQueen – actor, film producer, martial artist and race car driver in 1984 The Karate Kid and 1986 The Karate Kid Part IISteven R. McQueen – actor (The Vampire Diaries)
Sam Milby – actor, model
Cymphonique Miller – singer and actress (How to Rock)
Vanessa Minnillo – MTV VJ and former Miss Teen USA
Jewel Mische – actress and model
Derrick Monasterio – actor, singer and dancer
Paolo Montalban – actor (Mortal Kombat: Conquest), model
Troy Montero – actor
Sofia Moran - actress (Women in Cages 1971 Produced by Roger Corman, Planet Terror portion in Grindhouse (film) Directed by Quentin Tarantino and Robert Rodriguez), Filipino female singer/recording artist, beauty queen, philanthropist
Sam Morelos – actress (That '90s Show)
Rex Navarrete – comedian, voice actor in Myx channel's cartoon The NutshackTrue O'Brien – actress (Days of Our Lives)
Jazz Ocampo – actress and commercial model
Belinda Panelo – MTV VJ
Angelica Panganiban – actress and comedienne
Van Partible – creator/director/writer of cartoon series Johnny BravoJennifer Paz – actress, most notable for voice of Lapis Lazuli (Steven Universe)
Nia Peeples – actress and singer
Lou Diamond Phillips – actor
Charee Pineda – actress and politician
Stef Prescott – actress and model
Malia Pyles – actress (Pretty Little Liars: Original Sin)
Jay R – R&B singer
Shelby Rabara – actress and dancer, most notable for the voice of Peridot (Steven Universe)
Sue Ramirez – Filipino actress, whose father is an American citizen.
Victoria Recaño – correspondent (The Insider), actress (CSI: Miami)
Sheryn Regis – singer, actress
Ernie Reyes Jr. – actor, martial artist
Ernie Reyes Sr. – actor, martial artist, fight choreographer
Conrad Ricamora – singer and actor (How to Get Away with Murder)
Jackie Rice – actress
Alden Richards (Richard Faulkerson) – actor, singer
Melissa Ricks – actress
Olivia Rodrigo – actress and singer-songwriter (Bizaardvark, High School Musical: The Musical: The Series)
Tom Rodriguez – actor and former Pinoy Big Brother: Double Up housemate
Jelynn Rodriguez – actress "The Drop" (TV series)
Vincent Rodriguez III – actor (CW "Crazy Ex-Girlfriend")
Jason Rogel – actor (Splinterheads, Swamp Shark, The Great State of Georgia)
Tura Satana – actress ("Varla" in Russ Meyer's cult film, Faster, Pussycat! Kill! Kill! (1965)). "Satana's father was a silent movie actor of Japanese and Filipino descent, and her mother was a circus performer of Native American (Cheyenne) and Scots-Irish background.
Rob Schneider – Saturday Night Live performer, actor, comedian 
Nicole Scherzinger – singer, actress
Steven Silva – actor, model
Pepe Smith — late rock star
Liza Soberano – actress, model
Paul Soriano – film director and producer
Shannyn Sossamon – actress (40 Days and 40 Nights, A Knight's Tale)
Hailee Steinfeld – actress, singer (Pitch Perfect 2, Barely Lethal, Term Life, The Edge of Seventeen, Pitch Perfect 3, Bumblebee)
Jon Timmons – actor, model and television personality
Chuti Tiu – actress (Desire, 24, Dragnet, Beautiful, The Specials)
G. Toengi – actress, singer
Whitney Tyson – actress and comedienne
Michelle Vergara Moore – actress (Condor, The Unusual Suspects, The Time Of Our Lives, Black & White & Sex)
Jillian Ward – actress, singer and model
Marsha Garces Williams (Filipino father) - film producer, mother of Zelda Williams 
Zelda Williams (Filipino grandfather ) - actress, daughter of Robin Williams and Marsha Garces Williams
Charlyne Yi – actress (Knocked Up, Paper Heart)
Megan Young – actress, beautyqueen, crowned as Miss World 2013, sister of Lauren Young
Lauren Young – actress, sister of Megan Young

 Disc jockeys 

DJ Babu (Chris Oroc) – disc jockey of the World Famous Beat Junkies and member of the hip hop group Dilated Peoples. Hails from Oxnard, California.
Mix Master Mike (Michael Schwartz) – Beastie Boys disc jockey, founding member of the Invisibl Skratch Piklz; winner of 1992 and 1993 DMC World DJ Championships (Rocksteady DJ's) and winner of the 1992 New Music Seminar/Supermen Inc. DJ Battle for World Supremacy. Appears in the documentary film Scratch.
DJ Qbert (Richard Quitevis) – San Francisco Bay Area hip-hop disc jockey and pioneering turntablist. Founding member of the Invisibl Skratch Piklz; winner of 1991 (solo) 1992 (Rocksteady DJ's), 1993, (Dreamteam) DMC World DJ Championships. Featured in the movie Hang the DJ. Appears in the documentary films Modulations and Scratch. Created animated pop film Wave TwistersDJ Riddler (Rich Pangilinan) – disc jockey at WKTU in New York, Sirius Satellite Radio, record producer, remixer and member of the group MYNT
DJ Virman (Virman Coquia) of the group Far East Movement
DJ Bonics – disc jockey of rapper Wiz Khalifa

 Music 
Robert Lopez – composer, first Filipino American Oscar recipient. Recipient of a Grammy Award, Emmy Award and a Tony Award; twelfth individual to achieve an EGOT.

 Rock music 
Craig Abaya – award-winning songwriter, singer, musician, recording artist and producer
Noah Bernardo – drummer – P.O.D.
Melina Duterte – musician better known by her stage name Jay Som
Jerome Fontamillas – Switchfoot guitarist and keyboardist
Lowell George – songwriter, singer and slide guitarist of the rock band Little Feat 
Christopher Guanlao – drummer/songwriter for Silversun Pickups
Kirk Hammett – lead guitarist for Metallica (Filipina mother)Haley Heynderickx – singer-songwriter from Portland, Oregon
Anthony Improgo – drummer of the Band Metro Station
Mike Inez – bassist of Alice in Chains
Dan Layus – lead singer, guitarist of the band Augustana
Jared Palomar – bassist, and pianist of the band Augustana
Arnel Pineda – vocalist of the band Journey
Joey Santiago – lead guitarist of the Pixies, credited by Kurt Cobain as influential to his music, albums include the classic Surfer Rosa and Doolittle. Later formed a band "The Martinis" with his wife.
Matthew Santos – rock and folk singer-songwriter, musician and painter, father of part-Filipino descent.

 Pop music 
Leah Dizon – model, singer, actress, and TV personality in Japan.
Enrique Iglesias – Spanish pop music singer-songwriter.
Bruno Mars – half-Filipino, quarter-Puerto Rican, quarter-Hungarian Jewish; R&B singer
Olivia Rodrigo — half-Filipino, half-American, actress, Pop singer-songwriter
Maile Misajon – singer of Eden's Crush.
Bella Poarch - singer, TikTok star
Larry Ramos – guitarist, banjo player, and vocalist with the American pop band the Association and the New Christy Minstrels.
Nicole Scherzinger – lead singer for the Pussycat Dolls. (Filipino father, Hawaiian/Russian mother, birth name was Nicole Valiente)Jasmine V – singer
Jocelyn Enriquez - singer, 90's pop diva, Christian vocalist

 American Idol Contestants 
Reynaldo Lapuz – American Idol contestant (Season 7).
Guji Lorenzana – alternative rock, pop rock solo artist, American Idol contestant (Season 3).
Ramiele Malubay – American Idol contestant (Season 7).
Thia Megia – American Idol contestant (Season 10).
Jessica Sanchez – American Idol contestant; Father is Mexican, Mother is Filipina (Season 11), finished as the Runner-Up.
Jasmine Trias – American Idol contestant (Season 3), finished in 3rd place.
Camile Velasco – American Idol contestant (Season 3), finished in 9th place.
Malaya Watson  – American Idol contestant (Season 13), finished in 8th place.

 Rap, hip hop 
DJ Qbert – turntablist, composer, producer
Danny Brown – rapper who is half African American and half Filipino.
Pressa - Canadian rapper
Guapdad 4000 - rapper of African-American and Filipino descent
Chad Hugo – music producer and musician; one-half of The Neptunes.
Ruby Ibarra – rapper, music producer, and spoken word artist
Allan Pineda Lindo – known as apl.de.ap. Member of the Grammy Award-winning hip-hop group The Black Eyed Peas
Maliibu Miitch – rapper of African-American, Vietnamese and Filipino descent
Travis McCoy – Gym Class Heroes singer; Haitian/Italian/Irish/Filipino/Native American
Saweetie – rapper who is half African-American and half Filipino-Chinese
Cassie Ventura – known as Cassie (born August 26, 1986, in New London, Connecticut), R&B and pop singer, model, and actress.
Dominic Fike – rapper who is half African American and half Filipino.

 Music producers 
Chazwick Bradley Bundick – American recording artist and producer also known as Toro y Moi
Illmind – hip hop producer
Arian Leviste – electronic music artist, record producer and disc jockey
Shawn Wasabi – record producer
Cha Cha Malone - music producer

 R&B 
Sugar Pie DeSanto – born as Umpeylia Marsema Balinton, Filipino-American rhythm and blues singer of the 1950s and 1960s
Billy Crawford – R&B, pop and soul singer 
H.E.R. (Filipino mother) – R&B
Adrian Marcel - R&B singer, songwriter, and rapper from Oakland, California. Who is half African American and half Filipino

 Jazz 
Bobby Enriquez – "The Wild Man", prodigious pianist
Bob Parlocha – saxophonist and longtime host of a syndicated nightly jazz radio program
Danny Barcelona – jazz drummer, part of Louis Armstrong's All-Stars from 1958 onward

 International world music 
Joe Bataan – Latin soul legend

 Classical music 
Manuel Kabajar Cabase – composer, arranger, conductor, multi-instrumentalist, movie musical director, Halad Museum Inductee
Evelyn Mandac – soprano opera singer and winner of the Metropolitan Opera Auditions.
Eugene F. Castillo – conductor, born in Hollywood, CA, is now the music director of the Philippine Philharmonic Orchestra, Cultural Center of the Philippines

 Composers 
Craig Abaya – award-winning songwriter, singer, musician. Collaborator with JoAnne Lorenzana (1st cousin) and DJ Qbert. Same person as the filmmaker and photographer.
Nilo Alcala – the first Filipino-American composer recipient of the prestigious Copland House Residency Award.

 Other / miscellaneous genres 
Amapola Cabase – singer, actor, producer, TV Host of "Amapola Presents Show" KEMO-TV (now KOFY) San Francisco, California
Kriesha Chu – K-Pop singer based in South Korea
Frankie Cosmos – singer, songwriter
Kate Earl – singer, songwriter  
Jocelyn Enriquez – techno and house singer of "Do You Miss Me?"
Carlo Gimenez – lead guitarist for Dia Frampton
Billy Hinsche – lead guitarist for Dino, Desi & Billy
Rachael Lampa – Christian singer
Gerard Damien Long – known as Hodgy Beats. Member of the hip-hop collective OFWGKTA and the duo MellowHype, rapper and producer.
Neal McCoy – country music singer.
Sophia Montecarlo – singer, model, a "Born Diva", grand finalist.
Jaya Ramsey – freestyle artist
Ana Roxanne – experimental musician and singer
Steve Lacy — American musician, singer, songwriter, and record producer. Member of music group: The Internet.
Chanty — Member of K-pop band Lapillus

 Musical groups 
 
One Vo1ce – All-Filipina girl R&B/OPM singing group from the San Francisco Bay Area
Blue Scholars – Geo aka. Prometheus Brown, MC of the duo, is Filipino-American
Death Angel – thrash metal band
Kai – San Francisco Bay Area boy band
Moonpools & Caterpillars – Filipino American rock band based in California in the 1990s
My American Heart – rock band
The Rocky Fellers – group was composed of four Filipino brothers and their father. Their hit song: "Killer Joe" reached No. 16 on the Billboard Hot 100 in April 1963.

Legaci – Filipino-American R&B band from the San Francisco Bay Area, California, formed in 1997. They are currently the backup singers for Canadian Pop-R&B singer Justin Bieber on the My World Tour.
Q-York – Filipino-American hip hop record production duo composed of Flava Matikz (DJ/producer) and Knowa Lazarus (songwriter/MC).

 Reality show 

Leah Cohen – contestant on Top Chef (Season 5)
Angelica Hale – contestant on America's Got Talent (season 12)
Charmaine Hunt – contestant on The Apprentice season 5
Melody Lacayanga – So You Think You Can Dance contestant (Season 1 runner-up).
Manila Luzon – drag performer and runner-up on RuPaul's Drag Race (Season 3), former contestant in RuPaul's Drag Race All Stars (Seasons 1 and 4).
Sandra McCoy – actress, former contestant in Pussycat Dolls Present: The Search for the Next Doll.
Asia Nitollano – Pussycat Dolls Present: The Search for the Next Doll winner; daughter of Joe Bataan.
Ongina – drag queen and spokesperson for MAC Cosmetics
Ellona Santiago – FOX The X Factor U.S. finalist (Season 3).
Josie Smith-Malave – contestant on the show Top Chef contestant (Season 2).
Greggy Soriano – cast as "Greggy" Cake Boss: Next Great Baker on TLC and "Greggy, the Self Proclaimed 'Gaysian'" Beauty and the Geek contestant (Season 5) on The CW Network.Interview With Greggy Soriano afterelton.com 
Amy Vachal – NBC The Voice U.S.'' finalist (Season 9).

Internet 

Christine Gambito – American Internet personality, actress, and comedian; she maintains one of the most-subscribed-to channels on YouTube. Also appointed Ambassador of Philippine tourism
Anthony Padilla – famous YouTube celebrity; he is former one half of the comedy duo Smosh and is one of the most subscribed YouTubers on YouTube
Wil Dasovich – television personality, commercial model, celebrity endorser and famous YouTube vlogger. He won the Shorty Awards for Vlogger of the Year.
Bretman Rock – US-based Filipino internet personality and beauty influencer; he stars in his own reality TV show on MTV
Michael Reeves (Internet personality) – A tech and comedy YouTuber currently streaming under the American media collective known as OfflineTV.
Valkyrae - A YouTube streamer currently co-owning 100 Thieves. Also won Game Award for Content Creator of the Year 2020.

Other 

Leandro Aragoncillo – former FBI intelligence analyst and retired Gunnery Sergeant in the United States Marine Corps who was charged with espionage and leaking classified information against President Gloria Macapagal Arroyo.
Thomas Beatie – Filipino father, female-to-male transgender man who is legally male and married as a male. Beatie had chest reconstruction and testosterone therapy but kept his female reproductive organs intact. He is notable for having had had several pregnancies since becoming physically male.
Helen Agcaoili Summers Brown (1915-2011), also known as Auntie Helen, a teacher, librarian, and founder of the Pilipino American Reading Room and Library. She was born in Manila to a Filipino mother and an Anglo father, and moved to America after her graduation from Manila Central High School.
Andrew Cunanan – half-Italian, half-Filipino American gay alleged spree killer during the mid-1990s; allegedly murdered several of his lovers, including the Italian fashion designer Gianni Versace. Father was a retired United States Navy from the Philippines.
Ralph Deleon – convicted of conspiracy to support terrorist.
Pearlasia Gamboa – controversial business woman successfully sued by the United States Securities and Exchange Commission
Christina Marie Williams (1985–1998) – murdered child.
Wesley So – Chess grandmaster, World Fischer Random Chess Champion, and 3-time and the current U.S. Chess Champion.

References 

Lists of American people of Asian descent

Americans
Lists of people by ethnicity